Maria Abdy, née Smith, also known as Mrs Adby, (25 February 1797 – 19 July 1867) was an English poet.

Life
Maria Abdy was born in London. She was an only child. She was the daughter of Richard Smith, a solicitor, and Maria Smith, sister to James and Horace Smith, authors of the book of parodies Rejected Addresses (1812).

Although her mother was from a dissenting family, in 1821 she married John Channing Abdy, a clergyman who succeeded his father as rector of St John's, Southwark. John Channing Abdy and Maria Abdy had at least one boy, Albert Channing Abdy (born 1829), who attended Oxford and became a clergyman. Maria Abdy was widowed in 1845. She died on 19 July 1867 in Margate, and was buried at St Peter's, Kent.

Poems
Abdy's husband appears to have encouraged her to publish poetry. One poem in her first collection was written to celebrate the centenary of his church, and several of her religious poems were intended to be sung as hymns. Yet she also published poetry in periodicals, such as (under the signature M.A.) the New Monthly Magazine and The Metropolitan Magazine, and annuals such as The Keepsake, Forget-Me-Not, Friendship's Offering and the Book of Beauty. Her poems occasionally offered serious social comment, and sometimes addressed social themes with a lighter satirical touch.

Works
 (as Mrs Abdy) Poetry, privately printed, 1834 
 Poetry, 2nd series, privately printed, 1838 
 Poetry, 3rd series, privately printed, 1842 
 Poetry, 4th series, privately printed, 1846
 Poetry, 5th series, privately printed, 1850 
 Poetry, 6th series, privately printed, 1854 
 Poetry, 7th series, privately printed, 1858
 Poetry, 8th series, privately printed, 1862

References

Further reading
 Feldman, Paula R. British Women Poets of the Romantic Era: An Anthology. JHU Press, 1997,pp. 1–5.

External links
 Index of Maria Abdy's Contributions to British Literary Annuals

1797 births
1867 deaths
English women poets
Christian poets
19th-century English poets
19th-century English women writers
19th-century English writers
Writers from London